The 2015 Campeonato Mato-Grossense de Futebol was the 73rd edition of the Mato Grosso's top professional football league. The competition began on 1 February and ended on 11 May. Cuiabá won the championship for the 6th time.

First phase

Group A

Group B

Second phase

Group C

Group D

Semifinals

Finals

''Cuiabá won 2–1 on aggregate.

References

Mato Grosso
Campeonato Mato-Grossense